Mary Hardway Walker (c. 1848–1969) was purportedly one of the last surviving American former enslaved persons when she died in 1969. She was purportedly born in Union Springs, Alabama in 1848. She was freed from slavery when she was 15 in 1863. She married and had her first child by age 20. In 1917, she moved with her family to Chattanooga, Tennessee where she cooked, cleaned, provided childcare, and sold sandwiches to support her local church. She enrolled in a literacy class in 1963, and was awarded various awards including U.S. Department of Health, Education, and Welfare certification as America's oldest student, and she was appointed as Chattanooga's Ambassador of Goodwill and received accolades from various Federal and local dignitaries. She learned to read at the age of 116 which is why she is referred to as the oldest student. She died at the age of 121. When she died in 1969, her retirement home was renamed after her.

See also
List of last surviving American enslaved people

References

1840s births
1969 deaths
People from Chattanooga, Tennessee
19th-century American slaves
People from Union Springs, Alabama
20th-century African-American people